Israël Querido (1 October 1872 – 5 August 1932) was a Dutch naturalist novelist. His novels are sympathetic to workers and the Socialist movement.

Works
Menschenwee, English translation Toil of Men

Gallery

References

1872 births
1932 deaths
20th-century Dutch novelists
20th-century Dutch male writers
Dutch socialists
Dutch Sephardi Jews
Writers from Amsterdam
Dutch male novelists